Target Racing is an auto racing team based in Italy and is sometimes known as BVM – Target Racing. Also the team run Malta Formula Racing, Glorax Racing, F & M and Black Bull Swiss Racing entries.

History
Target Racing was born in January 1997 from the experience gained in the highest categories of sports motoring (F.1, F.Indy, F.3000), combined with entrepreneurial spirit and passion, by Roberto Venieri. Target Racing debuted in 1997 in the Italian Formula 3 and Formula 3 Federal Championships remaining there until 2002,the year in which the Ravenna team won the F.3 Tricolor with Milos Pavlovic and the CSAI F.Renault Monza Under 19 Trophy with Luca Persiani. 2003 saw the confirmation of Target Racing at the top of Formula 3, with the second consecutive Italian title won by Fausto Ippoliti, with two victories. A success, in Pergusa, also for Omar Galeffi, in a weekend dominated by the team with the double completed by Ippoliti came second. 2004 saw the Romagna team start with two Dallara 304-Opel entrusted to Alessandro Ciompi and Andrea Tiso. During the season, Ciompi then preferred to emigrate to another team not before taking a pole with Target. In 2005,Target launched the young Riccardo Azzoli alongside the Greek Elias Papalias. The Lazio driver immediately distinguished himself as one of the most interesting promises of the tricolor F.3 conquering the fourth final place while Papalias grew from race to race, well advised by team manager Roberto Venieri, making his sixth final place.

2006 represented a turning point for Target: the abandonment of the Dallara chassis for the equally Italian one of the SLC and the decision to measure itself in a more competitive championship like the German one. Target, in collaboration with the SLC technicians themselves, has thus taken care of the development of single-seater cars, once again deploying Riccardo Azzoli and the promising Salvatore Gatto, who had already competed in F.Azzurra with Target. Interesting the results achieved by both, but unfortunately budget problems have frustrated the work done. After a 2007 in which Target lived a period away from the championships, but the work of preparing cars was not lacking, the Ravenna team returns in 2008 first person in the Italian F.3 championship, in the meantime became a Dallara-Fiat single-brand, deploying the 2007 F.Azzurra champion: Salvatore Cicatelli.

The 2008 season therefore proposed Target again, joining Giuseppe Mazzotti's BVM, among the protagonists of the tricolor. Cicatelli has confirmed himself as one of the best national promises taking third place and the chance to try the Ferrari F.1 in the end-of-season award test. 2009,on the other hand, saw the tricolor series increase its membership and media interest. And Target-BVM achieves the title goal leading to an absolute victory in the Daniel Zampieri category, debuting in the F.3. An exceptional result, confirmed by the second place of the other driver of the Ravenna team, Marco Zipoli. At the end of 2009, Zampieri and Zipoli were able to test the Ferrari F.1 on the Jerez track. Zampieri was also chosen by Ferrari for the new driver program called Driver Academy. A further source of pride for Roberto Venieri and all his staff. In 2010,another exciting season for Target-BVM. This time it was with Cesar Ramos that the Italian team won the F.3 national title, a goal reached at the last event at Monza. A historic double that of the team based in Lugo di Ravenna that in the meantime has expanded its activity to the covered wheels committing to the Lamborghini Trophy in the best way because even in this category Venieri has taken home the first place overall using the name Black Bull!

In 2011,a small big revolution. Target, still united with the BVM name, enters the World Series Renault 3.5 with drivers Daniel Zampieri and Sergio Canamasas. Roberto Venieri's team focuses on the preparation of the powerful cars made by Dallara, then leaving the management of the F.3 single-seater to the BVM headquarters, while continuing to deal with races with wheeled cars covered under the Black Bull signs. No longer Lamborghini Trophy, but Endurance races, with a Ferrari 430 with which she competed in the Blancpain GT and in the races organized by Peroni Promotions. In the World Series Renault, there is no shortage of interesting results with the Spaniard Canamasas able to sign a pole position in Budapest and win places obtaining the eighth final place. Not bad for a team debuting in such a high-level international championship!

In 2012 the double commitment World Series Renault 3.5 continues as BVM Target and Blancpain Endurance GT as Black Bull. Drivers for the 3.5 series Italian Giovanni Venturini and The Russian Nikolay Martsenko. Immediately the points arrive, but after four appointments Venturini decides to leave the team. Venieri then relied on other drivers such as Sergey Sirotkin, Tamas Pal Kiss, Daniel Zampieri, Davide Rigon, always maintaining Martsenko's presence. At the end of the season, the decision for 2013 to leave the World Series Renault 3.5 to devote himself full time to the Black Bull project with the accession to the Blancpain Endurance GT, the GT Italia championship and the Coppa Italia races of Peroni Promotion employing two Ferrari 458s.

In 2013,Roberto Venieri's team competed in the Italian Gran Turismo GT3 Championship under the name of Black Bull Swiss Racing and there was no lack of satisfaction. He immediately finished second in the series with drivers Maino-Venturi. The following year, 2014,the return to formulas, precisely in the Italian Formula 4 training. The name of the team is Malta Formula Racing and once again Venieri's men stand out by taking second place with Mattia Drudi.

The presence in F4 continues in 2015 with the young Guzman and Kanayet, but alongside this program there is the return to the Gran Turismo world, precisely in the European Blancpain Endurance with birzhin-mancini-mastronardi drivers in three events: Monza, Le Castellet and Silverstone. The name of the team, Glorax.

The 2016 season was an extremely challenging season for lugo's team. In F4, under the insignia of DR Formula Racing, Raul Guzman took third place (also deploying Petrov and Wohlwend) while other great satisfactions came from Gran Turismo: in the Italian GT3 championship, Black Bull Swiss Racing won the tricolor title with Gai-Venturi, but not only. The debut in the Lamborghini Super Trofeo Europa saw Venieri's team, under the insignia of Raton Racing, win the championship with Lind, also first in the Lamborghini Super Trofeo World Final.

In the wake of these successes, DR Formula continued in 2017 in the Italian F4 with Petrov, Braquinho and Festante while in the tricolor GT3 Gai-Rugolo-Venturi signed the second position, as occurred in the Lamborghini Super Trofeo Europe, where in the AM category Giannoni made its own the place of honor. At the end of the year, com Target Racing also took first place in the GTX class at the Abu Dhabi 12 Hours with Lammers-Sereethoranakul-Al Azhari drivers.

Another challenging beautiful season was that of 2018. In the Italian F4, as DR Formula, three drivers lined up: Petrov, Morricone and Toth. In the Blancpain Endurance, there was participation in the legendary 24 Hours of Spa with the Folco-Costantini-Delhez-Debs crew, marathon finished in second place in class. With Di Folco-Costantini, Venieri's team also participated for the first time in the entire International GT Open championship. Finally, there was no lack of commitment in the Lamborghini Europa Super Trophy where Giannoni, Lind-Larsson, Boguslavsky-Shaitar were deployed in the various classes with sporadic appearances by Forné and Atoev.

2019 marked the exit from F4, but the commitment to the indoor wheel championships tripled. The year began with participation in the Dubai 24 Hours, as Target Racing, with Lind-Altoè-Boguslavsky-Herbst, crew that took fifth place in the Pro Am category. Target Racing then competed in the Lamborghini Middle East Super Trophy: in the Pro class came the absolute victory with Boguslavsky-Schandorff while in the Pro Am Larsson-Ohlsson they took third place. Wide participation in the Lamborghini Europe Super Trophy with Di Folco-Venditti, Giannoni, Vossos, Harkema-Bakker and Schandorff-Cecotto. This last pair of drivers took first place in the decisive World Final of the Lamborghini Super Trophy. Then there was the participation in the Blancpain Endurance GT3 as Raton Racing by Target and a well-deserved third-place finish obtained by Lenz-Costantini-Forné. Third place also as a team. And third place in class at the 24 Hours of Spa with Costantini-Forné-Di Folco. That's not all, because Raton Racing by Target raced in the International GT Open to take third place in the AM category with Liang-Giammaria. Another crew, Lenz-Di Folco while at a race began Perera.

Former Series Results

Formula Renault 3.5

Italian Formula 4

Timeline

References

External links

Italian auto racing teams
World Series Formula V8 3.5 teams
Italian Formula 3 teams
International GT Open teams
German Formula 3 teams
Blancpain Endurance Series teams
Formula Renault Eurocup teams
Auto racing teams established in 1997